Keppel Sound (Spanish: Bahia de la Cruzada ) is a bay to the north of West Falkland in the Falkland Islands. Islands in/bordering the sound include Golding Island and Keppel Island.

References

West Falkland
Straits of the Falkland Islands
Bays of West Falkland